Denise Ysabel Barbacena (born November 2, 1994) is a Filipino actress, singer, and popularly known as finalist of the first season of the reality show, Protégé: The Battle For The Big Break, a reality search contest, created by GMA Network as an official protégé of Gloc-9.

She is best known for her collaborations with Gloc-9, such as "Hari ng Tondo" and "Dapat Tama".  As an actress, she appears in the gag show Bubble Gang as well as other television series such as A1 Ko Sa 'Yo, Legally Blind and Little Nanay.  In film, she became part of the main cast of 1st ko si 3rd.

Career
In 2011, Barbacena became a contestant for the talent search show Protégé: The Battle For The Big Break of GMA Network where she represented Mega Manila.  Barbacena was chosen by of Gloc 9 to be his protégé in the said television show.  She made it to the finals after singing "Pag-ibig Ko'y Pansinin," which was originally recorded by Faith Cuneta.  After being eliminated on November 6, 2011, she landed on the eighth place.

Barbacena was featured in Gloc 9's song "Hari ng Tondo."  It was used as a theme song for the 2011 film Manila Kingpin: The Asiong Salonga Story and their collaboration won the Best Theme Song in the 60th FAMAS Awards.  Another collaboration with Gloc 9 happened in 2013 as they were tapped by GMA News and Public Affairs to do "Dapat Tama," an advocacy campaign jingle for public awareness during mid-term Philippine elections in 2013.  In 2014, the campaign including the music video of "Dapat Tama" gained merit honors in the 49th Anvil Awards given by the Public Relations Society of the Philippines under the category Public Relations Programs in a Sustained Basis.  For winning the Anvil Awards, the Philippine House of Representatives adopted resolution number 1694 commending the achievement of the "Dapat Tama" campaign.

In 2013, Barbacena joined the cast of Bubble Gang where she had done many comedy skits including spoofing Yaya Dub, the character of Maine Mendoza in "Kalyeserye."  Incidentally, in 2017, Barbacena recorded the singles "Aking Tadhana" and "To Be Yours, I'm Destined" for the original soundtrack of Destined to Be Yours, which top billed by Maine Mendoza and Alden Richards. In the pilot episode of Destined to be Yours in February 2017, "Aking Tadhana" topped the iTunes PH list of songs.

She also starred in the comedy series A1 Ko Sa 'Yo in 2016.  Barbacena was included in the main cast of the indie film 1st ko si 3rd making her film debut.

Personal life
Aside from singing, Barbacena also plays a piano as a hidden talent, and also a comedian.

Discography

Singles 
"Hari Ng Tondo" - from the original soundtrack of Manila Kingpin: The Asiong Salonga Story
"Dapat Tama" (ft. Gloc-9) - GMA Network campaign jingle for Philippine elections of 2013
"Papel" (ft. Joey Ayala & Gloc9 a song finalist for PhilPop Music Festival 2013)
"Aking Tadhana" and "To Be Yours, I'm Destined" from the original soundtrack of Destined to be Yours
"My Jagiya" (with Janno Gibbs) - from the original soundtrack of My Korean Jagiya
"Last Thing I'd Do" - local soundtrack of About Time
"Aking Mundo" - from the original soundtrack of Bolera
"Akin Na 'To" - from the original soundtrack of Abot-Kamay na Pangarap

Filmography

Television

Film

Awards and nominations

See also
Gloc-9

References

External links

1994 births
Living people
Universal Records (Philippines) artists
21st-century Filipino women singers
Filipino women rappers
Singers from Manila
Actresses from Manila
Participants in Philippine reality television series
Protégé (TV series) participants
GMA Network personalities